Prolatilus is a monotypic genus of percomorph fish from the family Pinguipedidae.  The only species in the genus, Prolatilus jugularis, the Pacific sandperch, is found in the south eastern Pacific of the coast of Peru and Chile. It occurs over rocky and sandy bottoms and feeds on  crustaceans, polychaetes and small fish.  This species is considered to be good quality food fish and is commercially exploited.

References

Pinguipedidae
Monotypic fish genera
Fish described in 1833